The European Film Award for Best Actress is an award given out at the annual European Film Awards to recognize an actress who has delivered an outstanding leading performance in a film industry. The awards are presented by the European Film Academy (EFA) and was first presented in 1988 to Spanish actress Carmen Maura for her role as Pepa in Women on the Verge of a Nervous Breakdown.

Juliette Binoche, Isabelle Huppert, Carmen Maura and Charlotte Rampling are the only actresses who have received this award more than once with two wins each. Penélope Cruz is the most nominated actress in the category with five nominations followed by Juliette Binoche and Isabelle Huppert with four.

Winners and nominees

1980s

1990s

2000s

2010s

2020s

Multiple wins and nominations

Multiple wins

Multiple nominations

Superlatives

Age superlatives

Multiple nominations from the same film

See also
 BAFTA Award for Best Actress in a Leading Role
 BIFA Award for Best Performance by an Actress in a British Independent Film
 César Award for Best Actress
 David di Donatello for Best Actress
 Goya Award for Best Actress
 Polish Academy Award for Best Actress
 Robert Award for Best Actress in a Leading Role

References

External links
 European Film Academy archive

Actress
 
Film awards for lead actress
Awards established in 1988
1988 establishments in Europe